Giuseppe Fattoruso (17th century) was an Italian painter of the Baroque period, active in his natal city of Naples. He was a pupil of Andrea Vaccaro.

References

17th-century Neapolitan people
17th-century Italian painters
Italian male painters
Painters from Naples
Italian Baroque painters